David Lehmann is a Canadian Anglican bishop.

Lehmann was born in Toronto and educated at Camrose Lutheran College. He went to seminary at Wycliffe College in Toronto. He has served the Diocese of the Arctic in the Northwest Territories and in the Diocese of Edmonton. He was consecrated  the 10th Bishop of Caledonia on January 18, 2018.

References

Living people
21st-century Anglican Church of Canada bishops
Anglican bishops of Caledonia
University of Alberta alumni
Year of birth missing (living people)